Mark Keddell (born 13 February 1975) is a New Zealand sprinter. In 1995, Keddell won the 100m and 200m titles at the New Zealand Track and Field Nationals. On 4 February the same year he set a New Zealand record of 20.51 for 200m. This was the New Zealand record until Chris Donaldson bettered it by running 20.42 in March 1997. Keddell currently ranks third on the New Zealand all-time 200m list.

He competed in the men's 200 metres at the 1996 Summer Olympics.

References

External links
 

1975 births
Living people
Athletes (track and field) at the 1996 Summer Olympics
New Zealand male sprinters
Olympic athletes of New Zealand
Athletes from Christchurch